Elk Creek Township may refer to one of the following places in the United States:

 Elk Creek Township, Wright County, Missouri
 Elk Creek Township, Custer County, Nebraska
 Elk Creek Township, Erie County, Pennsylvania